Al Nasr Wal Salam or Nasser Wa Salaam (also known as Al-Hasuah) is a city in the Abu Ghraib district of Baghdad Governorate, about 30 km (18.6 mi) west of Baghdad. It has 208,506 inhabitants..
It is a Shiite-populated city with few Sunnis on the outskirts of Nasr City. About 200,000 people are Shiites and the rest are Sunnis. In 2003, there were 100,000 people, all Shiites displaced and killed by Sunni militias.

References 
 

Populated places in Baghdad Province